Peggy Luhrs (April 6, 1945 - February 22, 2022) was an American women's rights activist. She was active in the feminist and gay rights movements in Vermont from the 1970s until her death.

References

External links
Peggy Luhrs Interview about the New Burlington Women's Council

1945 births
2022 deaths
Women's rights activists